Andy Baquero Ruiz (born 17 August 1994) is a Cuban professional footballer who plays as a midfielder for Canadian Premier League club Valour FC.

Club career

Career in Cuba
Baquero played for hometown team La Habana, before joining Villa Clara in April 2017.

Valour FC
On 26 June 2021, Baquero signed with Canadian Premier League side Valour FC. He re-signed with the club in January 2022.

International career
Baquero has played in the 2011 CONCACAF U-17 Championship, 2013 CONCACAF U-20 Championship, 2013 FIFA U-20 World Cup and the 2014 Central American and Caribbean Games.

He made his senior international debut for Cuba versus Indonesia on 29 March 2014, and has, as of August 2018, earned a total of 17 caps, scoring one goal. He represented his country in two FIFA World Cup qualification matches and played at the 2015 CONCACAF Gold Cup.

International goals
Scores and results list Cuba's goal tally first.

Futsal
Baquero also plays for the Cuba national futsal team and featured at the 2016 FIFA Futsal World Cup.

References

External links
 

1994 births
Living people
Association football fullbacks
Cuban footballers
Cuban men's futsal players
Sportspeople from Havana
Cuban expatriate footballers
Expatriate footballers in the Dominican Republic
Cuban expatriate sportspeople in the Dominican Republic
Expatriate soccer players in Canada
Cuban expatriate sportspeople in Canada
FC Villa Clara players
FC Pinar del Río players
Delfines del Este FC players
Valour FC players
Liga Dominicana de Fútbol players
Cuba international footballers
Cuba youth international footballers
2015 CONCACAF Gold Cup players
2019 CONCACAF Gold Cup players
Competitors at the 2014 Central American and Caribbean Games
Central American and Caribbean Games bronze medalists for Cuba
Central American and Caribbean Games medalists in football